Saint-François-de-la-Rivière-du-Sud is a municipality in Quebec.

See also
 List of municipalities in Quebec

References

Municipalities in Quebec
Incorporated places in Chaudière-Appalaches
Canada geography articles needing translation from French Wikipedia